Felix Francis Mkosamali (born 4 June 1986) is a Tanzanian NCCR–Mageuzi politician and Member of Parliament for Muhambwe constituency since 2010.

References

1986 births
Living people
NCCR–Mageuzi MPs
Tanzanian MPs 2010–2015
Malagarasi Secondary School alumni